Survivor 2018 is the sixth season of Survivor Greece, the Greek version of the popular reality show. The season aired on Skai TV on January 21, 2018 in Greece and in Cyprus started airing the same day on Sigma TV. It is hosted by Sakis Tanimanidis & Giorgos Lianos. The show is produced by the company Acun Medya, which is owned and directed by Acun Ilıcalı. It is also being broadcast abroad via SKAI's international stations. Twelve players and twelve celebrities have been known in Greece through their work are invited to survive on a deserted island, the exotic Dominican Republic, for 6 months, having their luggage, the necessary clothes and basic food supply. Two players, one on each tribe joined them at second week. After 9 weeks from the beginning of the game, 6 new players, three on each team, joined the tribes.  On episode 101, the last team match took place and on episode 102, individual matches started. The Finals were held on 11, 12 & 13 July live in the open theatre of Alsos Veikou, Galatsi, Athens. The winner of sixth season was Ilias Gotsis from the team "Warriors" (Μαχητές).

On January 15, 2018 the team of Celebrities travelled from Greece to Dominican Republic and the team Warriors and Sakis Tanimanidis also travelled from Athens the next day to Dominican Republic.

From Greece, Doretta Papadimitriou is hosting the sister show (spin-off show) of Survivor, named Edo Survivor and premiered the same day with Survivor at 19:00 on Skai TV and aired on weekdays at 17:00 on Skai TV. After 3 weeks this show named Survivor Panorama and kept Doretta as the host but the show aired at 17:30 on Skai TV. Also, among Doretta two players from the previous season Evridiki Valavani from Diasimoi (Celebrities) team and Konstantinos Vasalos from Machites (Warriors) team are present in the program's panel among occasional guests.

Contestants
The names of the original tribes were Mαχητές (Machites, meaning warriors), and Διάσημοι (Diasimoi,  meaning celebrities).

Voting history

Nominations table 

 For this week, new players had immunity.

Results of the finals 
Color key
Result details

Team matches
From Episode 27, a tournament between Turkey, Romania and Greece started. Red is for Turkey, Yellow for Romania, Blue for Greece.
Tournament between Turkey, Romania and Greece was canceled. So, from Episode 37, a new tournament started between Turkey and Greece.
From Episode 62, a new tournament started between  Romania and Greece.
From Episode 78, a new tournament started between  Colombia and Greece.

Individual matches 
In the individual matches, the winner has the ability to choose one player to enjoy the reward with him/her, except the immunities.
At first two Immunity Games, Dalaka won't play because she won the symbol game and passed directly to the finals.

Finals

Symbol game

Players' symbols

 The players, who were in the merge, are in the list. The 2 players (man and woman) with the most symbols after the finals, they will travel to Greece in order to meet their families.

Due to injury, Stelios didn't play in Quarter-Final and he qualified for the Semi-Finals because the number of the players must be even. In episode 65, Stelios was eliminated from the game.

Quarterfinals

  Player qualified for semi-finals
  Player was eliminated for semi-finals

A player who hasn't won yet a symbol and loses the duel, he won't qualify to semi-finals of symbol game. A player who has won a symbol and loses the duel, he will qualify to semi-finals of symbol game losing a symbol.

Men's Quarterfinals (Episode 62)

Women's Quarterfinals (Episode 63)

Semi-finals

Men's Semi-final (Episode 67)

First Phase

Second Phase

Women's Semi-final  (Episode 67)

First Phase

Second Phase

Final

The players get 2 extra symbols in the final phase.

Men's Final

Women's Final

New symbol game
At episode 78, it was announced  that a new symbol game will take place. When the new symbol game is finished, the winner of the new symbol game will pass directly to the Finals of Survivor. The Players will have again the symbols which had before the Quarter-finals of the previous symbol game in order to play.

Players' Symbols before the Finals

Players' Symbols during the Finals

The women will get 2 extra symbols in order to play all of them at the Finals of symbol game.
The men will get 3 extra symbols in order to play all of them at the Finals of symbol game.

Women's Semi-final (Episode 104)

Men's Semi-final (Episode 104)

Final (Episode 104)

The 2 winners of semi-finals will play at the symbol game final. The winner is the player who will win 5 matches and will keep his/her symbols while the loser of the final will lose his/her symbols.

Ratings

References

2018 Greek television seasons
06
Television shows filmed in the Dominican Republic